The president of Somalia is the head of state of Somalia. The president is also commander-in-chief of the Somali Armed Forces. The president represents the Federal Republic of Somalia, and the unity of the Somali nation, as well as ensuring the implementation of the Constitution of Somalia and the organised and harmonious functioning of the organs of state. Currently, the president of Somalia is indirectly elected, chosen by the Federal Parliament of Somalia.

The office of President of Somalia was established with the proclamation of the Republic of Somalia on 1 July 1960. The first president of Somalia was Aden Abdullah Osman Daar.

History
The first president of Somalia was Aden Abdullah Osman Daar, one of the leaders of the Somali Youth League (SYL), who took office on 1 July 1960, the day on which Somalia was declared a republic. Since then the office has been held by seven further people: Abdirashid Ali Shermarke, Mohamed Siad Barre, Ali Mahdi, Abdiqasim Salad, Abdullahi Yusuf, Sharif Sheikh Ahmed, and Hassan Sheikh Mohamud. In addition, Sheikh Mukhtar acted as president between Shemarke's assassination and the coup d'état, and Aden Madoobe acted as president after Yusuf's resignation in the 2008.

Sharif Sheikh Ahmed took office on 31 January 2009, after being elected by the presidential election held in January 2009. Ahmed's term as President of Somalia officially ended In August 2012, concurrent with the conclusion of the transitional federal government's mandate and the start of the federal government of Somalia. He was succeeded in office by General Muse Hassan, who had been serving in an interim capacity.

President Hassan Sheikh Mohamud took office on 16 September 2012, after being elected by the presidential election held on 10 September 2012.

Qualifications and election
In order to become the president of Somalia, the candidate must:

(a) Be a Somali citizen and a Muslim; 

(b) Be not less than forty years of age; 

(c) Have relevant knowledge or experience for the role; 

(d) Be sound of mind; and

(e) Not have been convicted by a court of a major crime.

The election of the president must begin at least 30 days before the term of office of the incumbent president expires or 10 days after the presidency falls vacant, and must be completed within 30 days of the beginning of the election. Candidates must be declared to the bureau of the parliament within the first 10 days of this period, and elections must be completed within the remaining 20 days.

Formerly, the president was elected by the members of the Somali Parliament, requirements and who are eligible to become members of Parliament.

Term of office
The president is selected for a term of office of four years, with no term limits specified in the constitution. The term of office of the incumbent president continues until the president-elect takes office. On assuming office, the president takes the following oath before the parliament;

Duties and responsibilities
An outline of the duties are as follow:
 Appoint the prime minister,
 Serve as Commander-in-Chief of the Somali Armed Forces;
 Declare a state of emergency and war in accordance with the law,
 Appoint and dismiss the commanders of the forces at the federal government level on the recommendation by the Council of Ministers;
 Dismiss ministers, state ministers and deputy ministers on the recommendation of the prime minister;
 Sign draft laws passed by the federal Parliament in order to bring them into law;
 Open the House of the People of the Federal Parliament;
 Hold an annual session with the House of the People of the Federal Parliament;
 Appoint the chairman of the Constitutional Court, the High Court, and other judges at the federal government level in accordance with the recommendation of the Judicial Service Commission;
 Appoint senior federal government officials and the heads of the federal government institutions on the recommendation of the Council of Ministers;
 Appoint ambassadors and high commissions on the recommendation of the Council of Ministers;
 Receive foreign diplomats and consuls;
 Confer state honours on the recommendation of the Council of Ministers;
 Dissolve the House of the People of the Federal Parliament when its term expires, thereby prompting new elections;
 Pardon offenders and commute sentences on the recommendation of the Judicial Service Commission; and
 Sign international treaties proposed by the Council of Ministers and approved by the House of the People of the Federal Parliament.

List of presidents of Somalia

Latest election

See also
 Somalia
 Politics of Somalia
 Prime Minister of Somalia
 Vice President of Somalia
 Lists of office-holders

References

 
Government of Somalia
1960 establishments in Somalia